The following is a list of Angolan musicians:

Folk bands
Ngola Ritmos

Folk singers
Waldemar Bastos
Bonga
Teta Lando
Sam Mangwana
Lourdes Van-Dúnem

Contemporary folk singers
Paulo Flores
Neide Van-Dúnem

Contemporary alternative bands
Neblina

Contemporary/popular singers
Titica
Don Kikas
Neide Van-Dúnem

Rap bands
Army Squad

R&B singers
Diamondog
KeyLiza
Anselmo Ralph
Neide Van-Dúnem

Kizomba artists
Don Kikas

Kuduro bands
Buraka Som Sistema

Kuduro singers
Titica
Dog Murras

Kwaito/hip hop

Angolan musicians
Musicians
Angolan